Martin Fitzgerald Lawrence (born April 16, 1965) is an American comedian and actor. He came to fame during the 1990s, establishing a Hollywood career as a leading actor. He got his start playing Maurice Warfield in What's Happening Now!! (1987–1988). He was a leading actor in the Fox television sitcom Martin, the Bad Boys franchise, and House Party, Boomerang, Open Season, Wild Hogs, Nothing to Lose, Blue Streak, Life,  Black Knight, Big Momma's House, and A Thin Line Between Love and Hate.

Early life
The fourth of six children, Martin Fitzgerald Lawrence was born on April 16, 1965, in Frankfurt, West Germany. His father, John Lawrence, was serving in the U.S. military at the time of his birth. Lawrence's first and middle names were named after civil rights leader Martin Luther King Jr. and U.S. President John F. Kennedy, respectively. When Lawrence was seven, his father left the military, and the family moved from West Germany back to the United States, settling in Landover, Maryland, in the Washington, D.C., area. Following his parents' divorce when he was eight years old, Lawrence rarely saw his father, who was a police officer. His mother, Chlora (née Bailey), worked several jobs, including as a sales representative and cashier at various department stores to support her family.

During his teen years, Lawrence excelled at boxing. While living in Maryland, Lawrence attended Eleanor Roosevelt High School and Friendly High School, and he lived in Fort Washington, Md, becoming a Mid-Atlantic Golden Gloves boxing contender.

Career
In his early days, Lawrence did comedy shows in the Washington, D.C., area and supported himself through odd jobs. Comedian Ritch Snyder saw his act and suggested Lawrence make connections in New York. Lawrence ended up moving to New York City and found his way to the comedy club The Improv. Shortly after appearing at The Improv, Lawrence won a performance spot on Star Search. He did well on the show and made it to the final round, but did not win. However, executives at Columbia Pictures Television saw Martin's performance and offered him the role of Maurice Warfield in What's Happening Now!!; this was his first acting job. Upon cancellation of that show, Lawrence found bit parts in various films and television series. His breakthrough role was as Cee in Do the Right Thing. Other roles followed in films such as the House Party series, Talkin' Dirty After Dark, and the Eddie Murphy vehicle Boomerang.  During this period, entertainment mogul Russell Simmons selected him to host the groundbreaking series Def Comedy Jam on HBO. Def Comedy Jam gave many comedians (including Chris Tucker, Dave Chappelle, Mike Epps, Bernie Mac and Cedric the Entertainer) mainstream exposure.

During his stint with Def Comedy Jam, Lawrence appeared in his own hit series, Martin, which aired on Fox. The show ran from 1992 to 1997 and was an enormous success. Martin was the flagship of Fox's Thursday night line-up, which drew millions of viewers away from NBC's "Must See TV" line-up. He hosted Saturday Night Live on February 19, 1994, where he made crude remarks about women's genitalia and personal hygiene; the offensive portion of the monologue was edited out of NBC reruns and syndicated versions and Lawrence was banned from NBC for a period of time until he received an apology from the President of NBC at the time Warren Littlefield.  Martins ratings continued to skyrocket so much that Fox became more of a contender against NBC and came closer to being considered among the top television networks. In 1995 he acted alongside Will Smith in Bad Boys with wide success.

After Martin ended its run in 1997, Lawrence found work in comedy films. He often starred as the second lead opposite actors including Eddie Murphy, Danny DeVito, and Tim Robbins. Many of his films were blockbusters at the box office, including Nothing to Lose, Life, Blue Streak, and Big Momma's House. He also starred in critical and box office failures, including Black Knight and National Security. Regardless, his salary steadily increased to over $10 million per film role. He continues to work in film, with such films as Big Momma's House 2, which opened at No. 1 at North American box office and grossed almost $28 million its first weekend, and Wild Hogs (2007), in which he played a bored suburbanite seeking adventure on the open road in a biker comedy alongside John Travolta, Tim Allen and William H. Macy.

In 2006, Lawrence appeared on Inside the Actors Studio, during which Lawrence briefly brought back to life some of the characters he had portrayed on Martin. He also appeared in Open Season as Boog, one of the main characters of the film. The movie also starred Ashton Kutcher, Debra Messing, and Gary Sinise.

In 2008, Lawrence starred in Walt Disney Pictures' College Road Trip co-starring with Raven-Symoné. It was his first G-rated film, but not his first appearance in a children's film: he supplied a voice for Open Season (2006) opposite Ashton Kutcher.

In 2011, Lawrence reprised his role as FBI agent Malcolm Turner in Big Mommas: Like Father, Like Son, the third film in the Big Momma series.

In January 2013, it was announced that Lawrence and Kelsey Grammer were considering pairing up to star in a comedy for Lionsgate Television. Partners, paired the two actors as Chicago lawyers from "vastly different backgrounds who unexpectedly meet in court on the worst day of their lives." The show premiered on August 4, 2014, but was cancelled after one season after receiving poor reviews.

In 2020, Lawrence reprised his role as Detective Marcus Burnett in the third installment of the Bad Boys franchise, Bad Boys for Life, again alongside Will Smith. The film was considered a financial success, grossing $112 million in its first four days of release.

Lawrence starred in his first dramatic role in 2022's Mindcage alongside Melissa Roxburgh and John Malkovich.

Personal life

Relationships and family

Lawrence was engaged to actress Lark Voorhies in 1993. He married Miss Virginia USA, Patricia Southall, in 1995. Lawrence and Southall have a daughter, Jasmine Page (born January 15, 1996). They divorced in 1997, and Lawrence began a relationship with Shamicka Gibbs. The couple married on July 10, 2010, at Lawrence's Beverly Hills home. Actors Eddie Murphy and Denzel Washington were among the 120 wedding guests; Lawrence and Gibbs have two daughters, Iyanna Faith (born November 9, 2000) and Amara Trinity (born August 20, 2002). On April 25, 2012, Lawrence filed for divorce from Gibbs, citing irreconcilable differences and asking for joint legal and physical custody of the children.

Lawrence owns a farm near Purcellville, Virginia. For several years, he owned a large mansion in the Beverly Park community in Beverly Hills, where he wedded Gibbs. However, following their divorce, the property was available for lease at $200,000 per month in June 2012. In 2013, the property was up for sale for $26.5 million, and eventually he sold it for $17.2 million to Bruce Makowsky, buying an Encino, Los Angeles property for $6.63 million.

 Arrests, lawsuits and health problems 

In July 1995, while on the set filming A Thin Line Between Love and Hate, Lawrence lashed out in a violent rage and was then hospitalized at Cedars-Sinai Medical Center.

On May 8, 1996, he became increasingly erratic and was arrested after he brandished a pistol in the middle of an intersection on Ventura Boulevard in Los Angeles, screaming, "They're trying to kill me!" He was again hospitalized, with his public-relations agent citing exhaustion and dehydration as the reasons for this episode. On July 29, 1996, he tried to take a gun on a flight and received two years probation and a fine.

In January 1997, Lawrence's Martin co-star Tisha Campbell-Martin filed a lawsuit against him, alleging sexual harassment and abuse both on and off set. By April 1997, Campbell had settled the lawsuit, and returned to appear in the last two episodes of the series. In March 1997, Lawrence was arrested after punching a man in a Hollywood nightclub.

During August 1999, Lawrence slipped into a three-day coma after collapsing from heat exhaustion while jogging in  heat in preparation for Big Momma's House while wearing heavy clothing and a "plastic suit".

Filmography
Film

Television

Discography

Awards and nominations
 Blockbuster Entertainment Award
 nominated with Eddie Murphy for Favorite Comedy Team (2000) for the movie Life
 nominated for Favorite Actor (2001) for the movie Big Momma's House 
 NAACP Image Award
 won Outstanding Lead Actor in a Comedy Series (1995) for the series Martin
 won Outstanding Lead Actor in a Comedy Series (1996) for the series Martin
 nominated for Outstanding Lead Actor in a Comedy Series (1997) for the series Martin
 Kids' Choice Award
 nominated for Favorite Television Actor (1995) for the series Martin
 nominated for Favorite Television Actor (1996) for the series Martin
 nominated for Favorite Movie Actor (2001) for the movie Big Momma's House
 MTV Movie Award
 nominated with Will Smith for Best On-Screen Duo (1996) for the movie Bad Boys
 nominated for the movie Big Momma's House
 nominated with Will Smith for Best On-Screen Team (2003) for the movie Bad Boys II
 ShoWest – Male Star of Tomorrow (1995)
 Teen Choice Award – nominated for Wipeout Scene of the Summer (2000) for the movie Big Momma's House
 BET Comedy Award – won' Icon Comedy Award (2005)

References

External links

 
 Interview, 2005, BlackNews
 Interview, 7/03, BlackFilm
 Interview: January 25, 2006 on the Tavis Smiley show
 Martin Lawrence HBO Stand-Up Special Videos

Living people
1965 births
20th-century American comedians
20th-century American male actors
20th-century Canadian male actors
21st-century American comedians
21st-century American male actors
African-American film directors
African-American male actors
African-American stand-up comedians
American male film actors
American male screenwriters
American male television actors
American male voice actors
American stand-up comedians
Comedians from New York City
Film directors from Maryland
Film directors from New York City
Film directors from Virginia
Film producers from New York (state)
Male actors from New York City
People from Landover, Maryland
People from Purcellville, Virginia
Screenwriters from Maryland
Screenwriters from New York (state)
Screenwriters from Virginia
20th-century African-American people
21st-century African-American people